The women's 3000 metres event at the 1998 World Junior Championships in Athletics was held in Annecy, France, at Parc des Sports on 28 and 30 July.

Medalists

Results

Final
30 July

Heats
28 July

Heat 1

Heat 2

Participation
According to an unofficial count, 20 athletes from 15 countries participated in the event.

References

3000 metres
Long distance running at the World Athletics U20 Championships